Branford Marsalis (born August 26, 1960) is an American saxophonist, composer, and bandleader. While primarily known for his work in jazz as the leader of the Branford Marsalis Quartet, he also performs frequently as a soloist with classical ensembles and has led the group Buckshot LeFonque. From 1992 to 1995 he led the Tonight Show Band.

Early life
Marsalis was born on August 26, 1960, in Breaux Bridge, Louisiana, and raised in New Orleans. He is the son of Dolores (née Ferdinand), a jazz singer and substitute teacher, and Ellis Louis Marsalis, Jr., a pianist and music professor. His brothers Jason Marsalis, Wynton Marsalis,  and Delfeayo Marsalis are also jazz musicians.

Career

Musical beginnings: 1980–85 

After graduating from Benjamin Franklin High School in 1978, Marsalis attended Southern University, a historically black college in Baton Rouge, where he studied under renowned jazz clarinetist Alvin Batiste. At the encouragement of Batiste, Marsalis later transferred to Berklee College of Music in Boston. While a student at Berklee, Marsalis toured Europe playing alto and baritone saxophone in a large ensemble led by drummer Art Blakey. Other big band experiences with Lionel Hampton and Clark Terry followed over the next year, and by the end of 1981 Marsalis, on alto saxophone, had joined his brother Wynton in Blakey's Jazz Messengers. Other performances with his brother, including a 1981 Japanese tour with Herbie Hancock, led to the formation of his brother Wynton's first quintet, where Marsalis shifted his emphasis to soprano and tenor saxophones. He continued to work with Wynton until 1985, a period that also saw the release of his own first recording, Scenes in the City, as well as guest appearances with other artists including Miles Davis and Dizzy Gillespie.

Expanded output: 1985–95 

In 1985, he joined Sting, singer and bassist of rock band the Police, on his first solo project, The Dream of the Blue Turtles, alongside jazz and session musicians Omar Hakim on drums, Darryl Jones on the bass and Kenny Kirkland on keyboards. He became a regular in Sting's line-up both in the studio and live up until the release of Brand New Day in 1999.

In 1986, Marsalis formed the Branford Marsalis Quartet with pianist Kirkland, drummer Jeff "Tain" Watts and bass player Robert Hurst. That year, they released their first album, Royal Garden Blues. That lineup of the quartet would go on to release four more albums, the last of which, I Heard You Twice the First Time (1992), won the Grammy Award for Best Instrumental Jazz Album, Individual or Group.

In 1988, Marsalis co-starred in the Spike Lee film School Daze, also rendering several horn-blowing interludes for the music in the film. His witty comments have pegged him to many memorable one-liners in the film. In 1989, Marsalis played a 30-second cover of "Lift Every Voice and Sing" over the opening logos of Lee's film Do the Right Thing.

Between 1990 and 1994, Branford played with the Grateful Dead numerous times, and appeared on their 1990 live album Without a Net. He later appeared on Wake Up to Find Out, a full release of the March 29, 1990 concert he performed in.

In 1992, Marsalis became the leader of the Tonight Show Band on the newly launched The Tonight Show with Jay Leno, after Jay Leno replaced Johnny Carson. Initially, Marsalis turned down the offer, but later reconsidered and accepted the position. He brought with him the three other members of the Branford Marsalis Quartet, who became the Tonight Show Band's pianist, drummer and bass player, respectively.

In 1994, Marsalis formed the group Buckshot LeFonque (named after a pseudonym once used by Cannonball Adderley), a jazz group with elements of rock and hip-hop. That year, they released their first album, Buckshot LeFonque, which was mostly produced by DJ Premier.

In 1994, Marsalis appeared on the Red Hot Organization's compilation CD, Stolen Moments: Red Hot + Cool. The album, meant to raise awareness of the AIDS epidemic in African American society, was named Album of the Year by Time.

In 1995, Marsalis left The Tonight Show, having become unhappy in the role: he disliked that he was supposed to always show enthusiasm, even for jokes he thought were unfunny. He was succeeded as bandleader by guitarist Kevin Eubanks. In a well-publicized interview soon after leaving, Marsalis said, "The job of musical director I found out later was just to kiss the ass of the host, and I ain't no ass kisser." He also complained that when he did not laugh or smile, some viewers' perception was, "Oh, he’s surly. He hates his boss." When the interviewer asked if Marsalis did hate Leno, Marsalis responded, "Oh, I despised him." He later stated that he did not hate Leno, and that this was a sarcastic response to what he considered "a ridiculous question".

Transition: 1995–2007 
In 1997, bassist Eric Revis replaced Hurst in the Branford Marsalis Quartet. Kirkland died the following year, and was replaced by pianist Joey Calderazzo. The Branford Marsalis Quartet has since toured and recorded extensively. For two decades Marsalis was associated with Columbia, where he served as creative consultant and producer for jazz recordings between 1997 and 2001, including signing saxophonist David S. Ware for two albums.

In 2002, Marsalis founded his own label, Marsalis Music. Its catalogue includes Claudia Acuña, Harry Connick Jr., Doug Wamble, Miguel Zenón, in addition to albums by members of the Marsalis family.

Marsalis has also become involved in college education, with appointments at Michigan State University (1996–2000), San Francisco State University (2000–2002), and North Carolina Central University (2005–present). After Hurricane Katrina in 2005, Marsalis and Harry Connick, Jr., working with the local Habitat for Humanity, created Musicians Village in New Orleans, with the Ellis Marsalis Center for Music the centerpiece.

Classical and Broadway projects: 2008–10 
Under the direction of conductor Gil Jardim, Branford Marsalis and members of the Philharmonia Brasileira toured the United States in the fall of 2008, performing works by Brazilian composer Heitor Villa-Lobos, arranged for solo saxophone and orchestra. This project commemorated the 50th Anniversary of the revered Brazilian composer s death.

Marsalis and the members of his quartet joined the North Carolina Symphony for American Spectrum, released in February 2009 by Sweden's BIS Records. The album showcases Marsalis and the orchestra performing a range of American music by Michael Daugherty, John Williams, Ned Rorem and Christopher Rouse, while being conducted by Grant Llewellyn.

Marsalis wrote the music for the 2010 Broadway revival of the August Wilson play Fences.

On July 14, 2010, Marsalis made his debut with the New York Philharmonic on Central Park's Great Lawn. Led by conductor Andrey Boreyko, Marsalis and the New York Philharmonic performed Glazunov's "Concerto for Alto Saxophone" and Schuloff's "Hot-Sonate for Alto Saxophone and Orchestra." Boreyko, Marsalis and the Philharmonic performed the same program again in Vail, CO later that month and four more times at Avery Fisher Hall in New York, NY the following February.

2011–present 

In June 2011, after working together for over 10 years in a band setting, Branford Marsalis and Joey Calderazzo released their first duo album titled Songs of Mirth and Melancholy, on Branford's label, Marsalis Music. Their first public performance was at the 2011 TD Toronto Jazz Festival.

In 2012, Branford Marsalis released Four MFs Playin' Tunes on deluxe 180-gram high definition vinyl, prior to Record Store Day 2012 on April 21, 2012. This is the first recording of the Branford Marsalis Quartet with drummer Justin Faulkner, who joined the band in 2009, and was the first vinyl release from Marsalis Music. The album was named Apple iTunes Best of 2012 Instrumental Jazz Album of the Year.

Marsalis performed "The Star-Spangled Banner" on Wednesday, September 5, 2012, at the Democratic National Convention in Charlotte.

In 2019 Marsalis released The Secret Between the Shadow and the Soul, which he recorded in Australia with his quartet. Marsalis, commenting on the longevity of his band and their approach said, ahead of the album's release: '“Staying together allows us to play adventurous, sophisticated music and sound good. Lack of familiarity leads to defensive playing, playing not to make a mistake. I like playing sophisticated music, and I couldn’t create this music with people I don’t know.”

Personal life 
Marsalis lives in Durham, North Carolina with his wife Nicole and their two daughters. He was raised Catholic.

Awards and honors
 The Branford Marsalis Quartet received a Grammy Award in 2001 for their album Contemporary Jazz.
 In September 2006, Branford Marsalis was awarded an Honorary Doctorate of Music from Berklee College of Music. During his acceptance ceremony, he was honored with a tribute performance featuring music throughout his career.
 Marsalis won the 2010 Drama Desk Award in the category "Outstanding Music in a Play" and was also nominated for a 2010 Tony Award in the category of "Best Original Score (Music and/or Lyrics) Written for the Theatre" for his participation in the Broadway revival of August Wilson's Fences.
 Marsalis, with his father and brothers, were group recipients of the 2011 NEA Jazz Masters Award.
 In May 2012, he received an honorary Doctor of Music degree from the University of North Carolina at Chapel Hill.
 In June 2012, Marsalis, along with friend and fellow New Orleans native Harry Connick, Jr., received the S. Roger Horchow Award for Greatest Public Service by a Private Citizen, an award given out annually by the Jefferson Awards for Public Service, for their work in the Musicians' Village of New Orleans.
 On March 26, 2013, he received the degree of Doctor of Arts Leadership, honoris causa from Saint Mary's University of Minnesota.

Instruments and setup
Soprano: His most famous soprano has been a silver Selmer Mark VI with a modified bent neck. He is said to now be playing a Yamaha YSS-82ZR, and uses a Selmer D mouthpiece and Vandoren V12 Clarinet reeds 5+
Alto: Cannonball Vintage Series (model AV/LG-L) with a Selmer Classic C mouthpiece and Vandoren #5
Tenor: Selmer Super Balanced Action with a Fred Lebayle 8 mouthpiece and Alexander Superial size 3.5 reeds

Other appearances
 Marsalis performed alongside Sting and Phil Collins at the London Live Aid concert at Wembley Stadium on July 13, 1985.
 Featured as saxophonist on "Fight the Power" (1989) by Public Enemy.
 Marsalis assembled a band he called X-Men to open for the Grateful Dead at the Oakland Coliseum Arena on December 31, 1990. Other members were Kevin Eubanks, Robert Hurst, and Jeff Watts.
Wait Wait... Don't Tell Me! Guest on the "Not My Job" section of the show. On this performance he claimed the saxophone was the sexiest instrument, then insults the accordion.  In a later episode of the show, "Weird Al" Yankovic stands up for the accordion; later guest Yo-Yo Ma claimed the saxophone was in fact the sexiest.
Interviewed on Space Ghost Coast to Coast Episode 10: "Gum, Disease" (aired November 11, 1994). Although the Coast to Coast crew said, "He was the most pleasant, and well mannered guest we had ever interviewed", he didn't sign a release for merchandising rights, so the episode couldn't be on the Space Ghost Coast to Coast Volume One DVD.
Marsalis was featured in Shanice's 1992 hit "I Love Your Smile". In the second half of the song, he has a solo and Shanice says, "Blow, Branford, Blow"
He played the role of Lester in the movie Throw Momma from the Train (1987) and the role of Jordam in Spike Lee's 1988 musical-drama film School Daze.
Cameo as a repair man who asks Hillary on a date in the episode "Stop Will! In the Name of Love", and as himself in the episode "Sleepless in Bel-Air" on the sitcom The Fresh Prince of Bel-Air (1994).
Interviews with Marsalis are featured prominently in the documentary Before the Music Dies (2006).
 Marsalis was a guest judge on the final episode of the fifth season of Top Chef which took place in New Orleans, Louisiana.
 On April 28 and 29, 2009, Marsalis played with the Dead (the remaining members of the Grateful Dead) at the IZOD Center in East Rutherford, New Jersey, rekindling a relationship started when he performed with them at a set at Nassau Coliseum on March 29, 1990, during which, according to Dead aficionados, one of the greatest renditions of "Eyes of the World",  was performed.
 On July 21, 2010, Marsalis guested with Dave Matthews Band on the songs "Lover Lay Down," "What Would You Say" and "Jimi Thing" at the Verizon Wireless Amphitheater in Charlotte, NC.  This was the first time Marsalis had guested with Dave Matthews Band, although he had previously played with Dave Matthews and Gov't Mule on a cover of Bob Dylan's "All Along the Watchtower" on December 16, 2006, in Asheville, NC. Marsalis performed with the Dave Matthews Band again on December 12, 2012, at the PNC Arena in Raleigh, NC. For the Summer 2015 tour Marsalis has returned to guest for 3 shows, May 22, 2015, in Raleigh North Carolina ("Lover Lay Down", "Typical Situation", Jimi thing), June 12, 2015 in Hartford, CT ("Death On The High Seas", "Spaceman", "Jimi Thing", "Warehouse"), and July 29, 2015, in Tampa, FL ("Lover Lay Down", "Typical Situation", "Jimi Thing").
 Marsalis appeared as a special guest of Bob Weir and Bruce Hornsby at two festivals in the summer of 2012. They first performed at the All Good Music Festival in Thornville, OH on July 19, 2012, and then headed to Bridgeport, CT for a performance at Gathering of the Vibes the following day, July 20, 2012.
 Marsalis appeared as a special guest of Furthur for their performance at Red Rocks on September 21, 2013.
 Marsalis appeared as a special guest of Dead & Company for their second night of a two night headlining performance at Lock'n Festival on August 26, 2018.

Discography

As leader 
 Fathers & Sons with Wynton Marsalis, Ellis Marsalis, Chico Freeman, Von Freeman (Columbia, 1982)
 Scenes in the City (Columbia, 1984)
 Romances for Saxophone (CBS Masterworks, 1986)
 Royal Garden Blues (CBS, 1986)
 Renaissance (Columbia, 1987)
 Random Abstract (CBS/Sony, 1988)
 Trio Jeepy (CBS, 1989) – rec. 1988
 Crazy People Music (Sony Music, 1990)
 Mo' Better Blues (Columbia, 1990)
 The Beautyful Ones Are Not Yet Born (Sony Music, 1991)
 Herve Sellin Sextet/Brandford Marsalis (Columbia, 1991)
 Sneakers   (Columbia, 1992)
 I Heard You Twice the First Time  (Columbia, 1992)
 David and Goliath (Rabbit Ears, 1992)
 Bloomington (Columbia, 1993) – rec. 1991
 Buckshot LeFonque, Buckshot LeFonque (Sony Music, 1994)
 Loved Ones with Ellis Marsalis (Columbia, 1996) – rec. 1995
 The Dark Keys (Sony Music, 1996)
 Buckshot LeFonque, Music Evolution (Sony Music, 1997)
 Requiem (Sony Music, 1999) – rec. 1998
 Contemporary Jazz (Sony Music, 2000) – rec. 1999
 Creation with the Orpheus Chamber Orchestra (Sony Classical, 2001)
 Footsteps of Our Fathers (Marsalis Music, 2002)
 Romare Bearden Revealed (Marsalis Music, 2003)
 Eternal (Marsalis Music, 2004)
 Braggtown (Marsalis Music, 2006)
 American Spectrum (BIS, 2009)
 Songs of Mirth and Melancholy with Joey Calderazzo (Marsalis Music, 2011)
 Four MFs Playin' Tunes (Marsalis Music, 2012)
 Romances for Saxophone (Sony Music, 2013)
 In My Solitude: Live at Grace Cathedral (Marsalis Music, 2014)
 Upward Spiral with Kurt Elling (Marsalis Music, 2016)
 The Secret Between the Shadow and the Soul (Marsalis Music, 2019) – live rec. 2018

As sideman or guest 

With Art Blakey
 1980: Live at Montreux and Northsea (Timeless, 1981) – live
 1981: Killer Joe (	Union Jazz, 1982)
 1982: Keystone 3 (Concord Jazz, 1982) – live

With Terence Blanchard
 Terence Blanchard (Columbia, 1991)
 Malcolm X: The Original Motion Picture Score (Columbia, 1992)
 Wandering Moon (Sony Classical, 2000) – rec. 1999

With Joey Calderazzo
 In the Door (Blue Note, 1991)
 To Know One (Blue Note, 1992)
 Going Home (Sunnyside, 2015)

With Harry Connick Jr.
 We Are in Love (Columbia, 1990)
 Songs I Heard (Columbia, 2001)
 Occasion: Connick on Piano, Volume 2  (Marsalis Music/Rounder, 2005)
 Your Songs  (Columbia, 2009)
 Smokey Mary (Columbia, 2013)
 Every Man Should Know (Columbia, 2013)

With Bela Fleck
 Three Flew Over the Cuckoo's Nest  (Warner Bros., 1993)
 Tales from the Acoustic Planet (Warner Bros., 1995)
 Live Art  (Warner Bros., 1996)
 Little Worlds (Columbia, 2003)

With Dizzy Gillespie
 Closer to the Source (Atlantic, 1984)
 New Faces  (GRP, 1985)

With Grateful Dead
 Without a Net (Arista, 1990) – live rec. 1989–90
 Infrared Roses (Grateful Dead, 1991) – live
 Spring 1990 (The Other One) (Rhino Entertainment, 2014) – live rec. 1990
 Wake Up to Find Out  (Rhino Entertainment, 2014) – live rec. 1990
 The Best of the Grateful Dead Live (Rhino Entertainment, 2018) - compilation. on 1 track "Eyes of the World".

With Roy Hargrove
 The Vibe (Novus, 1992)
 With the Tenors of Our Time (Verve, 1994)

With Anna Maria Jopek
 ID (EmArcy, 2008)
 Ulotne (EmArcy, 2018)

With Delfeayo Marsalis
 Pontius Pilate's Decision (Novus, 1992)
 Minions Domain (Troubadour, 2006)

With Ellis Marsalis Jr.
 Whistle Stop (CBS, 1994)
 Loved Ones (Columbia, 1996)
 Pure Pleasure for the Piano (Verve, 2012)

With Wynton Marsalis
 Wynton Marsalis (Columbia, 1982)
 Think of One  (CBS, 1983)
 Hot House Flowers (Columbia, 1984)
 Black Codes (From the Underground)  (Columbia, 1985)
 Joe Cool's Blues (Columbia, 1995)
 Jump Start and Jazz (Sony Classical, 1997)

With Frank McComb
 Love Stories (Columbia, 2000)
 The Truth Vol. 2 (Expansion, 2006)
 A New Beginning (Boobescoot, 2010)

With Sting
 The Dream of the Blue Turtles (A&M, 1985)
 Bring On the Night (A&M, 1986)
 ...Nothing Like the Sun (A&M, 1987)
 The Soul Cages (A&M, 1991)
 Mercury Falling (A&M, 1996)
 Brand New Day (A&M, 1999)
 Live in Berlin (Deutsche Grammophon, 2010) – live
 44/876 (Interscope/A&M, 2018)
 My Songs (A&M, 2019) 
 The Bridge (A&M, 2021)

With James Taylor
 New Moon Shine (Columbia, 1991)
 Hourglass (Columbia, 1997)

With Doug Wamble
 Country Libations (Marsalis Music, 2003)
 Bluestate (Marsalis Music, 2005)

With Jeff "Tain" Watts
 Citizen Tain (Columbia, 1999)
 Watts (Dark Key Music, 2009)

With others
 Roy Ayers, You Might Be Surprised (Columbia, 1985)
 Allman Brothers, Cream of the Crop (Peach, 2018)
 Victor Bailey, Bottom's Up (Atlantic, 1989)
 Joanne Brackeen, Fi-Fi Goes to Heaven (Concord Jazz, 1987) – rec. 1986
 Alex Bugnon, As Promised (Narada/Virgin, 2000)
 Mary Chapin Carpenter, Stones in the Road (Columbia, 1994)
 Dori Caymmi, Kicking Cans (Qwest, 1993)
 Ornette Coleman, Celebrate Ornette (Song X, 2016)
 Steve Coleman, Sine Die (Pangaea, 1988)
 Crosby, Stills & Nash, Live It Up (Atlantic, 1990) – rec. 1986–90 
 Miles Davis, Decoy  (Columbia, 1984) – rec. 1983
 Dirty Dozen Brass Band, Voodoo (Columbia, 1989) – rec. 1987
 Ray Drummond, Susanita (Nilva, 1984)
 Kurt Elling, The Questions (Okeh, 2018)
 Kevin Eubanks, Opening Night (GRP, 1985)
 Robin Eubanks, Karma (JMT, 1991)
 Charles Fambrough, The Proper Angle (CTI, 1991)
 Benny Golson,  Tenor Legacy (Arkadia Jazz, 1998) – rec. 1996
 Paul Grabowsky, Tales Of Time And Space (Sanctuary, 2005)
 Dave Grusin, Migration (GRP, 1989)
 Russell Gunn, Young Gunn Plus (32 Jazz, 1998)
 Charlie Haden, Dream Keeper (DIW, 1990)
 Everette Harp, Common Ground (Blue Note Contemporary, 1993)
 Billy Hart, Oshumare (Gramavision, 1984)
 Shirley Horn, You Won't Forget Me (Verve, 1991)
 James Horner, Sneakers (Columbia, 1992)
 Bruce Hornsby, Harbor Lights (RCA, 1993)
 Robert Hurst, Robert Hurst Presents: Robert Hurst (Columbia, 1993)
 Bobby Hutcherson, Good Bait (Landmark, 1985)
 Miles Jaye, Miles (Island, 1987)
 Carole King, City Streets (Capitol, 1989)
 Kenny Kirkland, Kenny Kirkland (GRP, 1991)
 Bill Lee, Do the Right Thing: Original Motion Picture Score (Columbia, 1989)
 Michael McDonald, Wide Open (BMG, 2017)
 Marcus Miller, M² (Telarc, 2001)
 Youssou N'Dour, The Guide (Columbia, 1994)
 Neville Brothers, Uptown (EMI, 1987)
 Ivan Neville, Thanks (Iguana, 1995)
 Makoto Ozone, The Trio (Verve, 2000)
 John Patitucci, Communion (Concord Jazz, 2001)
 Courtney Pine, The Vision's Tale (Antilles, 1989)
 Eric Revis, In Memory of Things Yet Seen (Clean Feed, 2014)
 Sonny Rollins, Falling in Love with Jazz (Milestone, 1989)
 Renee Rosnes, Renee Rosnes (Blue Note, 1990)
 David Sanchez, Melaza (Columbia, 2000)
 Janis Siegel, At Home (Atlantic, 1987)
 Horace Silver,  It's Got to Be Funky (Columbia, 1993)
 Ed Thigpen, Young Men & Olds (Timeless, 1990)
 Tina Turner,  Break Every Rule (Capitol, 1986)
 Chucho Valdes, Border-Free (Harmonia Mundi/JazzVillage, 2013)
 Vinx, Rooms in My Fatha's House (I.R.S., 1991)
 Randy Waldman, Unreel (Concord Jazz, 2001)
 Joe Louis Walker, JLW (Verve, 1994)
 Was (Not Was), Born to Laugh at Tornadoes (Geffen, 1983)
 Rob Wasserman, Trios (GRP, 1994)
 Cleveland Watkiss, Blessing in Disguise (Polydor, 1991)
 Mark Whitfield, True Blue (Verve, 1994)
 Nancy Wilson, Forbidden Lover (CBS, 1993)
 Ben Wolfe, No Stranger Here (Maxjazz, 2008)
 Stevie Wonder, Conversation Peace (Motown, 1995) – rec. 1993–95

Filmography
Throw Momma From the Train (1987)
School Daze (1988)
Living Single Season 2 (1994–95)

Eve’s Bayou(Harry) - 1997

Branford Marsalis - The Sound illusionist (2016)

See also
Marsalis Jams

References

External links 
  – official site
 
 
 Branford Marsalis at Marsalis Music
 Branford Marsalis interview with Eric Jackson from WGBH Radio Boston
 Branford Marsalis at University of North Carolina Confers Doctor of Music
 Branford Marsalis at The New York Times
 Branford Marsalis - NAMM Oral History Interview March 21, 2015 

 

1960 births
Living people
People from Breaux Bridge, Louisiana
Jazz musicians from New Orleans
Musicians from New Rochelle, New York
American male saxophonists
Berklee College of Music alumni
Grammy Award winners
20th-century American musicians
The Jazz Messengers members
Louisiana Creole people
Columbia Records artists
The Tonight Show Band members
American jazz soprano saxophonists
African-American jazz musicians
Jazz musicians from New York (state)
21st-century American saxophonists
American male jazz musicians
Branford Marsalis Quartet members
Fairview Baptist Church Marching Band members
Buckshot LeFonque members
Marsalis family
African-American film score composers
American film score composers
Male film score composers
20th-century African-American musicians